Myripristis chryseres, the yellowfin soldierfish, is a nocturnal species of soldierfish from the genus Myripristis. It is found in the Indo-Pacific region, from Natal, South Africa to Samoa, Hawaii and the Tuamotu Islands, north to south Japan and the Ogasawara Islands, and south to Queensland, Australia
 It inhabits steep outer reef slopes and is often seen with Coelacanths at Ngazidja Island. It feeds on zooplankton and can be seen either solitary or in groups.

References

chryseres
Fish of the Pacific Ocean
Taxa named by David Starr Jordan
Taxa named by Barton Warren Evermann
Fish of the Indian Ocean